Véra Korène (6 June 1901 – 19 November 1996) was a Russian-born French actress and singer.

Born Rébecca Véra Korestzky in Russia of Jewish heritage, she fled the Revolution and settled in Paris, France.

Using the Francized name Korène, she began her career in the theatre but also appeared in a number of films during the 1930s. A mainstay of the Parisian stage, in the 1950s she organized her own theatre production company, putting on performances at the Comédie Française. In 1956 she was named director of the Théâtre de la Renaissance, a position she held until 1978.

Véra Korène died in 1996 in Louveciennes in a senior citizen's home and was interred in the Cimetière de Pantin in the Parisian suburb of Pantin.

Filmography

External links

French film actresses
French stage actresses
1901 births
1996 deaths
Sociétaires of the Comédie-Française
French people of Russian-Jewish descent
Emigrants from the Russian Empire to France
People who emigrated to escape Bolshevism
French National Academy of Dramatic Arts alumni
20th-century French actresses